Ferenc Bánhalmi (19 June 1923 – 2 February 1983) was a Hungarian sprinter who competed in the 1948 Summer Olympics and in the 1952 Summer Olympics. He was born and died in Budapest.

References

1923 births
1983 deaths
Hungarian male sprinters
Olympic athletes of Hungary
Athletes (track and field) at the 1948 Summer Olympics
Athletes (track and field) at the 1952 Summer Olympics
Athletes from Budapest